Floreat is a residential suburb  west-northwest of the central business district of Perth, the capital of Western Australia. It is bordered on Underwood Avenue, Selby Street, Cromarty Road and Durston Road. It is the head of the Town of Cambridge, which has its municipal offices and library in the suburb. The name of the suburb stems from the Latin word for "flourish" or "prosper", which is also the motto of the City of Perth, of which Floreat was a part when it was first built.

Demographics
Floreat had a population of 7,230 at the 2011 census, an increase of 205 from the 2006 census, and 277 from the 2001 census.

History

Amenities and facilities
The Floreat Forum shopping centre is located in the suburb. The varied shops include The Floreat Market, Coles, Woolworths, Best & Less, Sussan, Katies, Lorna Jane, Red Dot, Gazman, Blue Illusion, Subway, V Burger Bar  and multiple cafes such as Flourish, fave and The Coffee Club. It sits adjacent to the Town of Cambridge municipal offices and library. The centre also boasts a new Medical Centre, dining precinct and tavern. The suburb also sits adjacent to the popular Cambridge Street dining and commercial strip in neighbouring Wembley.

Floreat contains a range of sporting facilities, most notably the WA Athletics Stadium (opened May 2009) and Bendat Basketball Centre (opened January 2020). Both were developed following the closure and subsequent demolition of Perry Lakes Stadium and Perry Lakes Basketball Stadium. The suburb also contains the WA Rugby Centre (home of RugbyWA), Cambridge Bowling Club, and Perry Lakes Reserve.

Education
Floreat contains a public primary school, a lower primary campus of a Catholic school, and a private training institution. It was previously in the catchment area for the now-closed City Beach High School; high school students now attend Churchlands Senior High School if they live north of Cambridge Street, or Shenton College if they live on the south side.

Floreat Park Primary School, opened in 1951, is the only public school within the suburb's boundaries, and caters for students from kindergarten to Year 6.

The Floreat campus of Newman College, a multi-campus Catholic K-12 school, is located on Peebles Road, and caters for students from kindergarten to Year 3, after which students must shift to the school's senior campuses in nearby Churchlands. The site was formerly occupied from 1962 to 1983 by Brigidine College, a Catholic girls' school, which had shifted from a prior campus in Subiaco. The current campus was formed after a merger between Brigidine College and two other local Catholic schools, Marist College and Siena College, taking effect from 1984.

The Perth campus of the Australian Institute of Management is also located within the suburb. The institute provides training and qualifications in management skills; the Perth campus opened in 1987, and is situated on Birkdale Street.

Politics
Floreat is located in the federal electorate of Division of Curtin, currently held by Independent MP Kate Chaney, who unseated the former Liberal Party MP Celia Hammond in the 2022 Australian Federal Election. The suburb is split between the state electorates of Churchlands, held by Christine Tonkin, and Nedlands, held by Katrina Stratton.

The suburb has favoured conservative candidates throughout its history, generally those of the centre-right Liberal Party.

Kate Chaney
(1975–) 	Independent

References

 
Suburbs of Perth, Western Australia